Yuriy Orlov (born 2 June 1977) is a Ukrainian sailor. He competed in the Laser event at the 2004 Summer Olympics.

References

External links
 

1977 births
Living people
Ukrainian male sailors (sport)
Olympic sailors of Ukraine
Sailors at the 2004 Summer Olympics – Laser
Sportspeople from Kyiv
21st-century Ukrainian people